Wishart  is a suburb in the City of Brisbane, Queensland, Australia.

Geography 

Bulimba Creek flows through the suburb.

History 

The suburb was originally named by Queensland Place Names Board 1 August 1967. Name and boundaries confirmed by Minister for Survey and Valuation, Urban and Regional Affairs 11 August 1975. Boundaries altered by the Minister for Natural Resources and Mines, 22 April 2005. The suburb was once known as Mount Gravatt South. It was renamed after the Wishart family who were early settlers in the area.

Newnham Road in Wishart was originally part of a stock route from farming areas south of Brisbane to the Cannon Hill saleyards. The land beside Newnham Road was eventually developed into small farming blocks, reducing the width of the stock route to that of a normal road, but it was still used occasionally by travelling stock until the 1960s. As Brisbane grew the suburb was subdivided for residential blocks.

The median age of the Wishart population was 37 years, the same as the Australian median.  67.6% of people living in Wishart were born in Australia, compared to the national average of 69.8%; the next most common countries of birth were New Zealand 3.9%, England 2.8%, China 1.7%, India 1.6%, South Africa 1.3%.  74.7% of people spoke only English at home; the next most common languages were 3.4% Cantonese, 2.2% Mandarin, 2.2% Greek, 1.3% Hindi, 1.1% Korean.

The median age of the Wishart population was 39 years.  61.3% of people living in Wishart were born in Australia, compared to the national average of 66.7%; the next most common countries of birth were China 4.1%, India 3.3%, New Zealand 2.9%, South Korea 2.6%, England 2.4%.  65.9% of people spoke only English at home; the next most common languages were 6.5% Mandarin, 3.3% Cantonese, 3.0% Korean, 1.6% Greek, 1.3% Hindi.

Education 
The Brisbane Adventist College, Mansfield State High School and Mansfield State School are located near Wishart. Wishart State School is another school of Wishart.

See also

 List of Brisbane suburbs

References

External links
 ourbrisbane.com website, Wishart section via the Wayback Machine
 University of Queensland: Queensland Places: Wishart

Suburbs of the City of Brisbane
1967 establishments in Australia
Populated places established in 1967